The Shaori fortress is a Bronze Age megalithic structure in the Akhalkalaki Municipality in Georgia's southern region of Samtskhe-Javakheti. A cyclopean fort built using a dry masonry technique, it has an unusual plan, rhomboid with circular spaces, and is situated on the eponymous rocky mount, at an altitude of 2752 meters above sea level, in the Lesser Caucasus mountains, northwest of Paravani Lake. The fortress is inscribed on the list of the Immovable Cultural Monuments of National Significance of Georgia.

Architecture 

The Shaori fortress, formerly locally known also as Korogli (ultimately from Turkic Koroğlu), shares many topographical and architectural features with the Abuli fortress, another major cyclopean hillfort strategically located in the area around Paravani Lake. 

The Shaori fortress is built of large basalt blocks, without using mortar. It consists of two parts, each located on top of a steep peak. The central part is an irregular rectangle constructed in the highest area and can be accessed through a one-meter-wide and 1.3 meter-high gate from the east. The location and spatial organization of Shaori makes it an unlikely domestic center. Rather, it could have been used for religious purposes.

Historical and archaeological background  
The Shaori fortress first appears in literary sources in the geography of the early 18th-century Georgian scholar Prince Vakhushti. Leon Melikset-Bek was the first who attempted to systematically study the monolithic monuments of Georgia, Shaori included, in 1938. 

No archaeological excavations have been carried out at Shaori, making it difficult to precisely date or assign the monument to any particular culture. Similarity in construction technique and material with the Trialeti burial mounds has been observed, pointing to the first half of the 2nd millennium BC as a possible period of construction. 

In general, the spread of cyclopean fortresses is an archaeological testimony to the social changes in the South Caucasus in the Middle-to-Late Bronze Age, reflecting social differentiation and emergence of newly empowered elites. These forts were typically constructed on the steep slopes of mountains. Settlement distribution and cultural material suggest that those in charge of these hill forts exercised control over arable land and resources, but they may also have provided economic and defensive functions for their hinterlands.

References 

Buildings and structures in Samtskhe–Javakheti
Immovable Cultural Monuments of National Significance of Georgia
Castles and forts in Georgia (country)
Prehistoric Georgia (country)